J. Dorsey Ridley (born November 26, 1953) is an American politician. He was a member of the Kentucky State Senate from the 4th District, serving from 2004 to 2019. He is a member of the Democratic Party.  Ridley also served in the Kentucky House of Representatives from 1987 to 1994.

References

Living people
1953 births
Democratic Party Kentucky state senators
21st-century American politicians